Ila Arab Mehta (born 16 June 1938) is a Gujarati novelist and story writer from Gujarat, India.

Biography
Mehta was born on 16 June 1938 at Bombay (now Mumbai) to Gujarati writer Gunvantrai Acharya. Her family belonged to Jamnagar. She completed her schooling from Jamnagar, Rajkot and Mumbai. She completed BA with Gujarati in 1958 from Ramnarain Ruia College and MA in 1960. She taught at Ruia College from 1960 to 1967 and later at St. Xavier's College, Mumbai from 1970 to her retirement in 2000.

Works
In her early days, Mehta wrote in Akhand Anand, Navneet and Stree Jeevan magazines. She has written several novels including Trikonni Tran Rekhao (1966), Thijelo Akar (1970), Radha (1972), Ek Hata Diwan Bahadur (1976), Batris Laksho (1976), Varasdar (1978), Avati Kalno Sooraj (1979), Batris Putalini Vedana (1982), Ane Mrityu (1982), Dariyano Manas (1985), Vasant Chhlake (1987), Nag Pariksha, Panch Pagala Prithvi Par (1995), The New Life (2004), Parpotani Aankh (1988), Zili Me Kumpal Hathelima (2007). Jaherkhabarno MAnas (1985), Shabne Naam Hotu Nathi (1981) are novels with different subjects. Her novel Vaad (2011) is translated in English as Fence (2015) by Rita Kothari. Her novel Batris Putlini Vedna is a story of  women's struggle against injustice done to them and their attempt to establish their own identity. It centred around Anuradha, a main protagonist of the novel, and presents her anger against male chauvinism in the same way as Kundanika Kapadia's Saat Paglan Akashman (Seven Steps in the Sky; 1994).

Ek Cigarette Ek Dhupsali (1981), Viena-Woods (1989), Bhagyarekha (1995), Balavo Balvi Balvu (1998), Yom Kippur (2006). Ila Arab Mehtano Varta Vaibhav (2009) are her collections of stories. She has edited Varsha Adaljani Shreshth Vartao (1991), selected stories of Varsha Adalja.

Mrityu Naam Parpota Mare (1984) is her compilation of literary works by various authors on death.

Her writing is considered feminist.

Awards
She has been awarded by Gujarat Sahitya Akademi, Maharashtra Gujarati Sahitya Akademi, and Gujarati Sahitya Parishad.

Personal life
She married Arab Mehta, a doctor, in 1964 and has a son, Salil and a daughter, Sonali. She lives in Mumbai. Her father Gunvantrai Acharya and her younger sister Varsha Adalja are also Gujarati writers.

References

External links

 

Women writers from Maharashtra
20th-century Indian novelists
Living people
20th-century Indian short story writers
20th-century Indian women writers
1938 births
Gujarati-language writers
University of Mumbai alumni
Indian feminist writers
Novelists from Gujarat
Writers from Mumbai